Gege is a town in the Shiselweni district of southern Eswatini.

It is near the Bothashoop border crossing point towards Piet Retief in South Africa. It is on the MR13 road.

References

Populated places in Shiselweni Region
Eswatini–South Africa border crossings